David Roblin (April 19, 1812–March 1, 1863) was a lumber merchant and political figure in Canada West.

He was born in Adolphustown Township in Upper Canada in 1812, the son of John Roblin. He settled in Richmond Township and opened a general store there in 1832. In 1841, he moved to Napanee. He served as reeve for the township from 1841 to 1857 and warden for the united counties of Frontenac, Lennox and Addington from 1849 to 1857. Over time, he expanded his business interests into the trade in timber. He took advantage of his political connections to support legislation in favour of the Grand Trunk Railway and received a contract to build a railway bridge and an appointment as arbitrator for the railway company. In 1854, he was elected to the 5th Parliament of the Province of Canada representing Lennox and Addington; he was re-elected to the 6th Parliament. Although he was a Reformer, he helped prop up the Liberal-Conservative coalition during his time in office. Roblin was defeated in the next general election by Augustus Hooper and, having suffered financially from a collapse of the timber market in 1857, retired from politics.

He died at Napanee in 1863.

External links 
Biography at the Dictionary of Canadian Biography Online

1812 births
1863 deaths
Members of the Legislative Assembly of the Province of Canada from Canada West